Colonel Furcy Fondeur Lajeunesse (1814 – 22 November 1892) was a French-born Dominican Republic military man and politician.

Born in France, his family moved to the Spanish Captaincy General of Santo Domingo around 1820. His father was Louis Fondeur and his mother was Marguerite LaJeunesse, Comtesse De La Juvenile; he had 5 siblings. He married Jacinta Castro and had 5 children, he was widowed and remarried to María Luisa Fernández Fernández (1837–1895) and had 10 children.

On 14 September 1863, Fondeur signed the Act of the Independence of the Dominican Republic from Spain, and fought in the Dominican Restoration War as a colonel; he is considered a hero of the Battle of Santiago (1863). He was designated Minister of Foreign Affairs in 1867. Fondeur Lajeunesse was also president of the City Council of Santiago de los Caballeros.

See also
José María Imbert
Pedro Eugenio Pelletier

References

1814 births
1892 deaths
French emigrants to the Dominican Republic
French people in the Spanish Empire
Foreign ministers of the Dominican Republic
Dominican Republic military personnel
People of the Dominican Restoration War 
Dominican Republic independence activists
People from Santiago de los Caballeros
White Dominicans